Tabo Creek is a stream in Lafayette County in the U.S. state of Missouri. It is a tributary of the Missouri River.

Tabo is a corruption of Tabeau, the surname of a French Canadian pioneer.

See also
List of rivers of Missouri

References

Rivers of Lafayette County, Missouri
Rivers of Missouri